Victoria Houston is an American writer. She is the author of the Loon Lake Series, a series of murder mysteries. The mysteries are set in the Northwoods of Wisconsin against a background of fly fishing as well as fishing for muskie, bass, bluegill and walleyes. She has also written or co-authored over seven non-fiction books. Houston had been formerly married to a man nine years younger than herself, and their union led Houston to interview 40 couples in similar circumstances, resulting in the book Loving a Younger Man: How Women Are Finding and Enjoying a Better Relationship.  Houston lives and works in Rhinelander, Wisconsin.

Bibliography

Loon Lake Fishing Mystery

Dead Big Dawg (2019)
Dead Firefly (2018)
Dead Spider (2017)
Dead Loudmouth (2016)
Dead Rapunzel (2015)
Dead Lil' Hustler (2014)
Dead Insider (2013) 
Dead Tease (2012) 
Dead Deceiver (2011) 
Dead Renegade (2009) Bleak House Books 
Dead Hot Shot (2008) Bleak House Books 
Dead Madonna (2007) 
Dead Boogie (2006) 
Dead Jitterbug (2005) 
Dead Hot Mama (2004) 
Dead Frenzy (2003)
Dead Water (2001) 
Dead Creek (2000) 
Dead Angler (2000)
Loving a Younger Man: How Women Are Finding and Enjoying a Better Relationship
Making It Work: Finding the Time and Energy for Your Career, Marriage, Children, and Self
 with Jamie Raab
 My Health History
 with Tom Shelby
 Michelle and Me (2002)
 with James Simon
 Restore Yourself : A Woman's Guide to Reviving her Sexual Desire and Passion for Life (2001)
 with Helen L. Swan
 Alone After School: A Self-Care Guide for Latchkey Children and Their Parents
 Self-Care for Kids: A Practical Guide for Children and Their Parents

References

External links

Living people
American women novelists
1945 births
21st-century American women